12 Who Don't Agree is a 2009 non-fiction book by the Russian writer Valery Panyushkin. The book is based on the life of Russian opposition activists.

12 Who Don't Agree was published in 2009 in Zakharov Books (Russia). This book was also published in English translation in 2011 in Europa Editions.

Characters
 Marina Litvinovich
 Vissarion Aseev
 Anatoliy Ermolin
 Maria Gaidar
 Ilya Yashin
 Sergei Udaltsov
 Maxim Gromov
 Natalia Morar
 Victor Shenderovich
 Andrey Illarionov
 Garry Kasparov
 Valery Panyushkin – author of the book

Overview

 Published in Russia in 2009, journalist Valery Panyushkin's semi-autobiographical novel Twelve Who Don't Agree depicts twelve very different Russians from across the country's social, political and economic spectrum: chess champion and the chairman of the United Civil Front, Garry Kasparov. A columnist for the liberal Russian paper New Times, Viktor Shenderovich. The young center-left independent politician; Maria Gaidar. The passionate leader of the RPR-PARNAS party; Ilya Yashin. The unofficial leader of the radical communist group, the Vanguard of Red Youth; Sergei Udaltsov. The Bolshevik opposition-party leader; Maxim Gromov. The former adviser to President Vladimir Putin; Andrei Illarionov. The editor-in-chief of the popular dissident website Pravda Beslan; Marina Litvinovich. The former police officer and politician for 'Putin's Party,' United Russia; Anatoly Yermolin. The Moldovan investigative journalist for the Russian magazine New Times; Natalya Morar, and human rights activist Vissarion Aseev.

Events
 
 Taking place a year before the presidential election scheduled on March 2, 2008, the St. Petersburg march also came a week ahead of the local elections of the Saint Petersburg Legislative Assembly. The protest was organized by The Other Russia, a broad umbrella group including both left and right-wing opposition leaders; including the far-left Vanguard of Red Youth and its leader Sergei Udaltsov, with the National Bolshevik Party and its leader Eduard Limonov; as well as center-right 'liberals' such as former world chess champion and United Civil Front leader Garry Kasparov, and former Prime Minister of Russia and People Democratic Union leader Mikhail Kasyanov. Those of the Twelve not already listed were among the masses of journalists and unaffiliated civilians taking part in the assembly. Despite widespread support, the large numbers garnered by the protestors, and the initial 'success' of the first march; when more marches were planned for 14 April, in Moscow, and 15 April, in St. Petersburg, local and state police were prepared for the protestors, quickly overwhelming and arresting the resistance.

Analysis

 Despite distinctly different backgrounds, all twelve individuals became allies during their participation in the historic Dissidents March 2007. The March was purposefully and peacefully in violation of increasingly restrictive laws forbidding political demonstrations. Although each of the Twelve had their own personal reasons for taking part in the march, they also shared in the conviction that under Vladimir Putin the Russian government was (and is) becoming increasingly totalitarian, autocratic, and repressive. As a book published less than a decade ago, Panyushkin provides critical and essential insight for students of Russian history into the deteriorating democracy of post-Soviet Russia. If there is an underlying theme or message in 12 that Don't Agree, it is one of knitting together a tattered tapestry made up of the disjointed and oftentimes contradictory patchwork of different people and ideas, to unite them all under the common cause of democracy, and the sacred duty of tyrannicide for the preservation of liberty.

See also
 Dissenters' March
 2009 in literature
 Russian literature

References

External links
 Europa Editions - 12 Who Don't Agree

Russian non-fiction books
2009 non-fiction books
Zakharov Books books